Hololepta aequalis is a species of beetle belonging to the Histeridae family. Besides poplars, it also feeds on pines, willows, and tulips (especially Liriodendron tulipifera). Its annuli is V-shaped while its palpi is horizontally projecting in front of the head. The species' antennal lobe is under anterior angles of its prothorax while its labrum is free.

References

Further reading

Histeridae